Michael John Everitt (born 26 August 1968, in Banbury) is a British Anglican priest.

Early life and education
Everitt was born on 26 August 1968 in Banbury, Oxfordshire, England. He was educated at Warriner School, Bloxham and Banbury School. He studied at King's College, London, graduating with a Bachelor of Divinity (BD) degree and the Associate of King's College (AKC) award in 1990. That year, he entered the Queen's College, Birmingham to train for ordination. He spent 1991 at the Venerable English College, Rome, a Roman Catholic seminary in Rome, before returning to Birmingham to complete a Diploma in Theology (DipTh) in 1992.

Ordained ministry
Ordained in 1992, his first post was as a curate at St Andrew's Cleveleys. After this he was succentor and then precentor of Bloemfontein Cathedral. From 1998 to 2002 he was chaplain at St Martin's College, Lancaster then rector of St Wilfrid's Standish until his archdeacon’s appointment. 

From 2011 to 2019, Everitt was Archdeacon of Lancaster in the Diocese of Blackburn. In April 2019, it was announced that he would be the next canon pastor of Durham Cathedral in the Diocese of Durham: he was installed as a canon residentiary at Durham Cathedral on 22 September 2019.

References

1968 births
People from Banbury
Alumni of King's College London
Alumni of the Queen's Foundation
Archdeacons of Lancaster
Living people